The  is the collective name for four sections of railway lines operated by Kyushu Railway Company (JR Kyushu) in Fukuoka Prefecture, Japan. It runs between Kurosaki Station and Hakata station (66.6 km).

The sections called Fukuhoku Yutaka Line are:
 Part of the Kagoshima Main Line, between Kurosaki Station and Orio Station - 5.2 km
 Part of the Chikuhō Main Line, between Orio Station and Keisen Station - 34.5 km 
 The entire Sasaguri Line, between Keisen Station and Yoshizuka Station - 25.1 km 
 Part of the Kagoshima Main Line, between Yoshizuka Station and Hakata Station - 1.8 km

Rolling stock
A pre-series two-car BEC819 series AC battery electric multiple unit (BEMU) was tested on the line from April 2016, and entered revenue service on 19 October 2016. This was followed by six more trainsets, entering service in spring 2017.

References

Lines of Kyushu Railway Company